Demetrios Chalkokondyles, Latinized as Demetrius Chalcocondyles and found variously as Demetricocondyles, Chalcocondylas or Chalcondyles (14239 January 1511) was one of the most eminent Greek scholars in the West. He taught in Italy for over forty years; his colleagues included Marsilio Ficino, Poliziano, and Theodorus Gaza in the revival of letters in the Western world, and Chalkokondyles was the last of the Greek humanists who taught Greek literature at the great universities of the Italian Renaissance (Padua, Florence, Milan). One of his pupils at Florence was the famous Johann Reuchlin. Chalkokondyles published the first printed publications of Homer (in 1488), of Isocrates (in 1493), and of the Suda lexicon (in 1499).

Life
Demetrios Chalkokondyles was born in Athens in 1423 to one of the noblest Athenian families and was the cousin of the chronicler of the fall of Constantinople, Laonicus Chalcocondyles. He soon moved to the Peloponnese, with his Athenian family who had migrated after its persecution by the Florentine dukes. He migrated to Italy in 1447 and arrived at Rome in 1449 where Cardinal Bessarion became his patron. He became the student of Theodorus Gaza and later gained the patronage of Lorenzo de Medici, serving as a tutor to his sons. Afterwards Chalkokondyles lived the rest of his life in Italy, as a teacher of Greek and philosophy. One of Chalkokondyles' Italian pupils described his lectures at Perugia, where he taught in 1450:

Among his pupils were Janus Lascaris, Poliziano, Leo X, Castiglione, Giglio Gregorio Giraldi, Stefano Negri, and Giovanni Maria Cattaneo.

In 1463 Chalkokondyles was made professor at Padua, and later, at Francesco Philelpho's suggestion, in 1479 he took over the place of Ioannis Argyropoulos, as the head of the Greek Literature department and was summoned by Lorenzo de Medici to Florence. Chalkokondyles composed several orations and treatises calling for the liberation of his homeland Greece from what he called “the abominable, monstrous, and impious barbarian Turks.” In 1463 Chalkokondyles called on Venice and "all of the Latins" to aid the Greeks against the Ottomans, he identified this as an overdue debt and reminded the Latins how the Byzantine Greeks once came to Italy's aid against the Goths in the Gothic Wars (535–554 AD)

It was during his tenure at the Studium in Florence that Chalkokondyles edited Homer for publication, which, dedicated to Lorenzo de' Medici, is his major accomplishment. He assisted Marsilio Ficino with his Latin translation of Plato. During his tenure at Florence, the German classical scholar Johannes Reuchlin was one of his pupils. He also taught Alessandra Scala, the Florentine Greek and Latin poet.

Chalkokondyles married in 1484 at the age of sixty-one and fathered ten children. Finally, invited by Ludovico Sforza, he moved to Milan (1491/1492), where he taught until he died.

Work
He wrote in Ancient Greek the grammar handbook "Summarized Questions on the Eight Parts of Speech With Some Rules". He translated Galen's Anatomy into Latin.

As a scholar, Chalkokondyles published the editio princeps of Homer (Florence 1488), Isocrates (Milan 1493) and the Byzantine Suda lexicon (1499).
Greek Grammar, edited 1546 by Melchior Volmar in Basel
Latin translation of the Anatomical Procedures of Galen, edited and published in 1529 by Jacopo Berengario da Carpi
Ἡ τοῦ Ὁμήρου ποίησις ἅπασα, 1488, editio princeps of Homer's Iliad and Odyssey, edited by Bernardus Nerlius and Chalkokondyles, appeared in Florence, not before 13 January 1489, in two folio volumes. It was the first Greek book to be printed in Florence.  The Greek type used to print the 1488–1489 Homer is believed to have been cast by the Cretan Demetrius Damilas from the type that he had used to print Constantine Lascaris’ Erotemata (Milan 1476), the first book to be printed entirely in Greek, based upon the hand of Damilas’s fellow scribe Michael Apostolis.

See also
Chalkokondyles family
Greek scholars in the Renaissance

Notes

References
 Nancy Bisaha, Creating East and West: Renaissance humanists and the Ottoman Turks, University of Pennsylvania Press, 2006, pp. 113–15. 
 Deno J. Geanakoplos, "The discourse of Demetrius Chalcocondyles on the inauguration of Greek studies at the University of Padua", Studies in the Renaissance, 21 (1974), 118–44 and in Deno J. Geanakoplos, Interaction of the ‘Sibling’ Byzantine and Western Cultures in the Middle Ages and Italian Renaissance (330–1600), New Haven and London, 1976, pp. 296–304
 Jonathan Harris, Greek Émigrés in the West, 1400–1520, Camberley: Porphyrogenitus, 1995. 
 Robert Proctor, The Printing of Greek in the Fifteenth-Century, London, 1930, pp. 66–9.
 Fotis Vassileiou & Barbara Saribalidou, Short Biographical Lexicon of Byzantine Academics Immigrants to Western Europe, 2007.
 N.G. Wilson, From Byzantium to Italy. Greek Studies in the Italian Renaissance, London, 1992.

External links 

 
 The "First Edition" of the Iliad, article about the textual history the Iliad

1424 births
1511 deaths
Writers from Athens
Academic staff of the University of Perugia
Greek Renaissance humanists
Byzantine writers
Greek educators
Renaissance writers
Greek–Latin translators
15th-century Byzantine people
16th-century Greek people
Demetrius
15th-century Byzantine writers
15th-century Latin writers
15th-century Greek writers
16th-century Greek writers
16th-century male writers
15th-century Greek educators
16th-century Greek educators